Griffith Simmons Parlaman III (30 October 1958 – 23 November 2002), who often referred to himself as "Sean Parlaman", was a long-time college student and trafficking activist who, before his curious  and unexpected death, sought to raise awareness regarding the trafficking and prostitution of children into Thailand.  Parlaman was born in Los Angeles County, California, to Griffith Mead Parlaman (20 April 1923 – 22 October 1991) and Doris V. Simmons Parlaman (22 November 1923 – 11 February 2007); he fell to his death in Jomtien, Pattaya, Thailand. Parlaman created websites to represent his projects, such as the now-defunct capcat.org.

Beginnings
During his time in college he was able to secure government grants, to become a member of the Oregon steering committee of the 2000 Green Party Presidential campaign of Ralph Nader, and to get permission from Stephen King to make Stud City, a short, independent sequel to Stand by Me.

Activism
Mr. Parlaman moved to Thailand and continued his activism.  For example, Mr. Parlaman wrote: "At an age when we would regard them as still being children, over a thousand 
young girls from northern Thailand are being lured every year into prostitution. Girls, as young as 10, are being sold to the brothels of Bangkok, other Thai cities and overseas."  However, despite his efforts to raise awareness of local establishments' engaging in child prostitution, he was accused by those same institutions of being a pedophile himself, as was a common retaliatory tactic to quickly eliminate pesky activists.  On 30 September 2002, living in Thailand, Parlaman was charged with molesting a 12-year-old boy, but released on bail by the local magistrate due to lack of evidence, as the sole incriminating evidence against him was a bruise on the boy's neck.  On 23 November, after another accusation, Parlaman was to accompany police officers to their station for further questioning.  Instead, he jumped, fell, or was thrown to the street from his apartment building in the city of Pattaya, thereby closing the applicable case.  Mr. Parlaman was pronounced dead on the scene.

Controversies
Sean Parlaman had a feud with Don't! Buy! Thai! accusing their campaigners of being fundamentalist Christians, right-wing bigots, and pedophiles. Don't! Buy! Thai! was a campaign initiated in the early 1990s by child welfare advocate and author Andrew Vachss to boycott goods and services produced in Thailand until its government introduced formal and practical reforms to significantly curtail the prostitution of children.

Reactions to death
Before moving to Thailand, he was a resident of Ashland, Oregon and an avid supporter of high school athletics. Joel Smith, a First Team All-State Linebacker on the high school football team that won the 1998 OSAA 4A State Championship team, is quoted as saying, in response to his death, that "his commitment to the community and unselfishness in public service is a beacon of light in Southern Oregon and, in my mind, remain unrivaled to this day. It cannot be exaggerated how much he will be missed by those who knew him best."

Karen Money Williams, writer, editor, and longtime friend in Ashland  adds: "Sean had a quick wit, a huge heart, and a rare knowledge of contemporary culture--especially cinema and politics. To be in his presence was a joy, an inspiration, and a challenge to explore the world with gusto."

References

Further reading 
 “Parlaman shines at martial arts challenge”, Jackson County, Oregon, Mail Tribune, 16 June 2000
 “Foreign resident falls to his death from 15th floor of condo”, Pattaya Mail, 29 November 2002 (Derivative story: “Farang falls to his death from 15th floor of condo”, Farang News, 29 November 2002)
 “Obituaries: Sean Parlaman" Ashland Daily Tidings
 
 promotional page for Sean Parlaman at StephenKingShortMovies.com
 promotional page for Stud City at StephenKingShortMovies.com
  
  (These include .)
 “Steve Duin Fabrication” by Lou Bank at The Zero (Andrew Vachss' site)
 
 “Election Results”, Medford Mail Tribune, March 1999. (Parlaman ran unsuccessfully for a position on the seven-member Board of Directors of the Rogue Valley Transportation District.)
 “JPR will broadcast election-night coverage”, Medford Mail Tribune, November 2000. (Mention of Parlaman representing the Green Party for election-night coverage by Jefferson Public Radio.)
 "Obituaries: Griffith M Parlaman", Chattanooga Times, 26 October 1991.
 obituary for Doris Simmons Parlaman, Chattanooga Times Free Press, 13 February 2007.

1958 births
2002 deaths
People from Ashland, Oregon
American Quakers
American expatriates in Thailand